Cell potency is a cell's ability to differentiate into other cell types.
The more cell types a cell can differentiate into, the greater its potency. Potency is also described as the gene activation potential within a cell, which like a continuum, begins with totipotency to designate a cell with the most differentiation potential, pluripotency, multipotency, oligopotency, and finally unipotency.

Totipotency
Totipotency (Lat. totipotentia, "ability for all [things]") is the ability of a single cell to divide and produce all of the differentiated cells in an organism. Spores and zygotes are examples of totipotent cells.
In the spectrum of cell potency, totipotency represents the cell with the greatest differentiation potential, being able to differentiate into any embryonic cell, as well as any extraembryonic cell. In contrast, pluripotent cells can only differentiate into embryonic cells.

A fully differentiated cell can return to a state of totipotency. The conversion to totipotency is complex and not fully understood. In 2011, research revealed that cells may differentiate not into a fully totipotent cell, but instead into a "complex cellular variation" of totipotency. Stem cells resembling totipotent blastomeres from 2-cell stage embryos can arise spontaneously in mouse embryonic stem cell cultures and also can be induced to arise more frequently in vitro through down-regulation of the chromatin assembly activity of CAF-1.

The human development model can be used to describe how totipotent cells arise. Human development begins when a sperm fertilizes an egg and the resulting fertilized egg creates a single totipotent cell, a zygote. In the first hours after fertilization, this zygote divides into identical totipotent cells, which can later develop into any of the three germ layers of a human (endoderm, mesoderm, or ectoderm), or into cells of the placenta (cytotrophoblast or syncytiotrophoblast). After reaching a 16-cell stage, the totipotent cells of the morula differentiate into cells that will eventually become either the blastocyst's Inner cell mass or the outer trophoblasts. Approximately four days after fertilization and after several cycles of cell division, these totipotent cells begin to specialize. The inner cell mass, the source of embryonic stem cells, becomes pluripotent.

Research on Caenorhabditis elegans suggests that multiple mechanisms including RNA regulation may play a role in maintaining totipotency at different stages of development in some species. Work with zebrafish and mammals suggest a further interplay between miRNA and RNA-binding proteins (RBPs) in determining development differences.

Primordial germ cells

In mouse primordial germ cells, genome-wide reprogramming leading to totipotency involves erasure of epigenetic imprints.  Reprogramming is facilitated by active DNA demethylation involving the DNA base excision repair enzymatic pathway.  This pathway entails erasure of CpG methylation (5mC) in primordial germ cells via the initial conversion of 5mC to 5-hydroxymethylcytosine (5hmC), a reaction driven by high levels of the ten-eleven dioxygenase enzymes TET-1 and TET-2.

Pluripotency

In cell biology, pluripotency (Lat. pluripotentia, "ability for many [things]") refers to a stem cell that has the potential to differentiate into any of the three germ layers: endoderm (gut, lungs, yolk sac), mesoderm (muscle, skeleton, blood vascular, urogenital, dermis), or ectoderm (nervous, sensory, epidermis), but not into extra-embryonic tissues like the placenta.  However, cell pluripotency is a continuum, ranging from the completely pluripotent cell that can form every cell of the embryo proper, e.g., embryonic stem cells and iPSCs, to the incompletely or partially pluripotent cell that can form cells of all three germ layers but that may not exhibit all the characteristics of completely pluripotent cells.

Induced pluripotency

Induced pluripotent stem cells, commonly abbreviated as iPS cells or iPSCs, are a type of pluripotent stem cell artificially derived from a non-pluripotent cell, typically an adult somatic cell, by inducing a "forced" expression of certain genes and transcription factors. These transcription factors play a key role in determining the state of these cells and also highlights the fact that these somatic cells do preserve the same genetic information as early embryonic cells. The ability to induce cells into a pluripotent state was initially pioneered in 2006 using mouse fibroblasts and four transcription factors, Oct4, Sox2, Klf4 and c-Myc; this technique, called reprogramming, later earned Shinya Yamanaka and John Gurdon the Nobel Prize in Physiology or Medicine. This was then followed in 2007 by the successful induction of human iPSCs derived from human dermal fibroblasts using methods similar to those used for the induction of mouse cells. These induced cells exhibit similar traits to those of embryonic stem cells (ESCs) but do not require the use of embryos. Some of the similarities between ESCs and iPSCs include pluripotency, morphology, self-renewal ability, a trait that implies that they can divide and replicate indefinitely, and gene expression.

Epigenetic factors are also thought to be involved in the actual reprogramming of somatic cells in order to induce pluripotency.  It has been theorized that certain epigenetic factors might actually work to clear the original somatic epigenetic marks in order to acquire the new epigenetic marks that are part of achieving a pluripotent state. Chromatin is also reorganized in iPSCs and becomes like that found in ESCs in that it is less condensed and therefore more accessible. Euchromatin modifications are also common which is also consistent with the state of euchromatin found in ESCs.

Due to their great similarity to ESCs, the medical and research communities are interested iPSCs. iPSCs could potentially have the same therapeutic implications and applications as ESCs but without the controversial use of embryos in the process, a topic of great bioethical debate. The induced pluripotency of somatic cells into undifferentiated iPS cells was originally hailed as the end of the controversial use of embryonic stem cells. However, iPSCs were found to be potentially tumorigenic, and, despite advances, were never approved for clinical stage research in the United States until recently. Currently, autologous iPSC-derived dopaminergic progenitor cells are used in trials for treating Parkinson's disease. Setbacks such as low replication rates and early senescence have also been encountered when making iPSCs, hindering their use as ESCs replacements.

Somatic expression of combined transcription factors can directly induce other defined somatic cell fates (transdifferentiation); researchers identified three neural-lineage-specific transcription factors that could directly convert mouse fibroblasts (connective tissue cells) into fully functional neurons. This result challenges the terminal nature of cellular differentiation and the integrity of lineage commitment; and implies that with the proper tools, all cells are totipotent and may form all kinds of tissue.

Some of the possible medical and therapeutic uses for iPSCs derived from patients include their use in cell and tissue transplants without the risk of rejection that is commonly encountered. iPSCs can potentially replace animal models unsuitable as well as in vitro models used for disease research.

Naive vs. primed pluripotency states

Findings with respect to epiblasts before and after implantation have produced proposals for classifying pluripotency into two distinct phases: "naive" and "primed". The baseline stem cells commonly used in science that are referred as embryonic stem cells (ESCs) are derived from a pre-implantation epiblast; such epiblast is able to generate the entire fetus, and one epiblast cell is able to contribute to all cell lineages if injected into another blastocyst.  On the other hand, several marked differences can be observed between the pre- and post-implantation epiblasts, such as their difference in morphology, in which the epiblast after implantation changes its morphology into a cup-like shape called the "egg cylinder" as well as chromosomal alteration in which one of the X-chromosomes under random inactivation in the early stage of the egg cylinder, known as X-inactivation. During this development, the egg cylinder epiblast cells are systematically targeted by Fibroblast growth factors, Wnt signaling, and other inductive factors via the surrounding yolk sac and the trophoblast tissue, such that they become instructively specific according to the spatial organization.

Another major difference is that post-implantation epiblast stem cells are unable to contribute to blastocyst chimeras, which distinguishes them from other known pluripotent stem cells. Cell lines derived from such post-implantation epiblasts are referred to as epiblast-derived stem cells, which were first derived in laboratory in 2007. Both ESCs and EpiSCs are derived from epiblasts but at difference phases of development. Pluripotency is still intact in the post-implantation epiblast, as demonstrated by the conserved expression of Nanog, Fut4, and Oct-4 in EpiSCs, until somitogenesis and can be reversed midway through induced expression of Oct-4.

Native pluripotency in plants
Un-induced pluripotency has been observed in root meristem tissue culture, especially by Kareem et al 2015, Kim et al 2018, and Rosspopoff et al 2017. This pluripotency is regulated by various regulators, including PLETHORA 1 and PLETHORA 2; and PLETHORA 3, PLETHORA 5, and PLETHORA 7, whose expression were found by Kareem to be auxin-provoked. (These are also known as PLT1, PLT2, PLT3, PLT5, PLT7, and expressed by genes of the same names.) , this is expected to open up future research into pluripotency in root tissues.

Multipotency

Multipotency is when progenitor cells have the gene activation potential to differentiate into discrete cell types. For example, a hematopoietic stem cell —and this cell type can differentiate itself into several types of blood cell like lymphocytes, monocytes, neutrophils, etc., but it is still ambiguous whether HSC possess the ability to differentiate into brain cells, bone cells or other non-blood cell types.

Research related to multipotent cells suggests that multipotent cells may be capable of conversion into unrelated cell types. In another case, human umbilical cord blood stem cells were converted into human neurons. There is also research on converting multipotent cells into pluripotent cells.

Multipotent cells are found in many, but not all human cell types.  Multipotent cells have been found in cord blood, adipose tissue, cardiac cells, bone marrow, and mesenchymal stem cells (MSCs) which are found in the third molar.

MSCs may prove to be a valuable source for stem cells from molars at 8–10 years of age, before adult dental calcification. MSCs can differentiate into osteoblasts, chondrocytes, and adipocytes.

Oligopotency
In biology, oligopotency is the ability of progenitor cells to differentiate into a few cell types.  It is a degree of potency. Examples of oligopotent stem cells are the lymphoid or myeloid stem cells.
A lymphoid cell specifically, can give rise to various blood cells such as B and T cells, however, not to a different blood cell type like a red blood cell.  Examples of progenitor cells are vascular stem cells that have the capacity to become both endothelial or smooth muscle cells.

Unipotency

In cell biology, a unipotent cell is the concept that one stem cell has the capacity to differentiate into only one cell type. It is currently unclear if true unipotent stem cells exist. Hepatoblasts, which differentiate into hepatocytes (which constitute most of the liver) or cholangiocytes (epithelial cells of the bile duct), are bipotent. A close synonym for unipotent cell is precursor cell.

See also 
  Antimalarial Drug Discovery

Many substances with exceptional levels of whole-cell potency against CQR strains have been created by the production of compounds having two quinoline cores connected by an aliphatic chain or aromatic ring. Piperaquine, which has outstanding in vivo effectiveness and has been used extensively in clinical settings in China, is the counterpart that has been most thoroughly documented. Although the drug is still effective against CQR strains in Africa, broad resistance has recently appeared in places where piperaquine has been widely administered. Clinical studies have demonstrated the great effectiveness of a drug combination called Eurartesim, which contains piperaquine and dihydroartemisinin (DHA). Sigma-tau and the Medicines for Malaria Venture (MMV) together developed Eurartesim, which has just recently received EMA approval after being routinely used in clinics for more than ten years [84]. Other compounds, such the bisquinoline reported by Ridely, have also demonstrated great effectiveness against CQR strains; however, in this instance, toxicity implications (phototoxicity) were found, and its advancement as a clinical candidate was halted.

Generation of Organs Based on Decellularized Extracellular Matrix Scaffolds:

One of the biggest problems in modern medicine is the lack of donated organs for patients who have organ failure and require an organ transplant. This is particularly impressive for those who have had spinal cord injuries or renal or heart problems. Even though there are more of these patients every year, the availability of donated organs is quite constrained. To prevent transplant rejection, immunological incompatibility between donors and recipients, storage space restrictions, and even dthe onor's family approval of organ donation can all have an impact on this restriction. Hence, it appears important that alternate solutions be developed. Regenerative medicine is a cutting-edge treatment strategy that combines nuclear transfer, tissue engineering, and stem cell biology to repair damaged tissue. The word was first used by William Haseltine in 1999. He discovered that embryonic SCs can differentiate into every form of human body cell. William's explanation may appear straightforward at first, but if we dig a little further, we can see how regenerative medicine has great promise for the near future and might drastically alter how we treat patients whose organs have been severely damaged or failed. Different treatment procedures have been created today and regenerative medicine has given itself a specific position, while most of them are still in the early stages. 

Antimalarial Drug Discovery

Many substances with exceptional levels of whole-cell potency against CQR strains have been created by the production of compounds having two quinoline cores connected by an aliphatic chain or aromatic ring. Piperaquine, which has outstanding in vivo effectiveness and has been used extensively in clinical settings in China, is the counterpart that has been most thoroughly documented. Although the drug is still effective against CQR strains in Africa, broad resistance has recently appeared in places where piperaquine has been widely administered. Clinical studies have demonstrated the great effectiveness of a drug combination called Eurartesim, which contains piperaquine and dihydroartemisinin (DHA). Sigma-tau and the Medicines for Malaria Venture (MMV) together developed Eurartesim, which has just recently received EMA approval after being routinely used in clinics for more than ten years [84]. Other compounds, such the bisquinoline reported by Ridely, have also demonstrated great effectiveness against CQR strains; however, in this instance, toxicity implications (phototoxicity) were found, and its advancement as a clinical candidate was halted.
 Induced stem cells

References

External Links
 Blog on treatment therapy using pluripotent stem cells and pluripotent stem cell derived exosomes

Developmental biology
Cell biology
Stem cells